David Eugene Garnett (born December 6, 1970) is a former American football linebacker who played four seasons in the National Football League with the Minnesota Vikings and Denver Broncos. He played college football at the Stanford University and attended Naperville North High School in Naperville, Illinois.

References

External links
Just Sports Stats

Living people
1970 births
Players of American football from Pittsburgh
American football linebackers
African-American players of American football
Stanford Cardinal football players
Minnesota Vikings players
Denver Broncos players
21st-century African-American sportspeople
20th-century African-American sportspeople